Football in Antigua and Barbuda is one of the Caribbean country's most popular sports. It is second only to cricket.

 National Football Team

League system

Stadiums in Antigua and Barbuda

References